Sri (born Kommineni Srinivasa Chakravarthi, 13 September 1966 – 18 April 2015) was an Indian film composer playback singer, and television presenter, known for his works in Telugu cinema. He is the son of veteran Music composer K. Chakravarthy. He was the lead anchor for the 1995 show Anthakshari aired in Gemini TV.

He lend his vocals for  "Jagamanta Kutumbam Naadi" from the movie Chakram released in 2005. He is best known for his compositions in hits for films, such as Money Money, Little Soldiers, Sindhooram, Anaganaga Oka Roju, Aavida Maa Aavide, Gaayam and Ammoru.

Education
He did his BE in industrial engineering from Manipal University.

Death
He died due to a kidney related ailment on 18 April 2015, in Hyderabad, India.

Filmography

 Police Brothers
 Money
 Money Money
 Little Soldiers
 Sindhooram
 Anaganaga Oka Roju
 Gaayam
 Ammoru
 Aavida Maa Aavide
 Naa Hrudayam Lo Nidurinche Cheli
 Chantigaadu
 Neeke Manasichaanu
 Kaasi
 Chanti
 Sahasam
 Aadu Magaadra Bujji
 Amrutham Chandamamalo

Private albums
 Hai Rabba – Starring Smitha

References

Telugu film score composers
Telugu playback singers
Manipal Academy of Higher Education alumni
Indian male composers
20th-century Indian composers
Film musicians from Andhra Pradesh
Indian male playback singers
20th-century Indian singers
Singers from Andhra Pradesh
1966 births
2015 deaths
Male film score composers
20th-century Indian male singers